The 2023 European Senior Tour, titled as the 2023 Legends Tour, is the 32nd season of the European Senior Tour, the professional golf tour for men aged 50 and above operated by the PGA European Tour. It was also the third season since rebranding as the Legends Tour.

Schedule
The following table lists official events during the 2023 season.

Notes

References

External links

European Senior Tour
European Senior Tour